Chinese Chemical Letters is a monthly peer-reviewed scientific journal covering all aspects of chemistry. It was established in 1990 and is published by Elsevier on behalf of the Chinese Chemical Society. The editor-in-chief is Xu-Hong Qian (East China University of Science and Technology).

Abstracting and indexing 
The journal is abstracted and indexed in:
 Chemical Abstracts Service
 Science Citation Index Expanded
 Scopus
According to the Journal Citation Reports, the journal has a 2020 impact factor of 4.632.
{cite web |url=https://www.journals.elsevier.com/chinese-chemical-letters}

Coercive citations 
In 2015, it was reported by Jeffrey Beall that the journal offered to waive their article processing charge for authors whose articles would be cited more than 6 times (apparently including self-citations) in the first two years after publication. This practice is known as coercive citation. In a reaction, the editorial office stated that this episode "was totally due to the inappropriate English expression of our newly joined editor" and that "[t]he publication fee waiver based on the citations has been eliminated."

References

External links 
 

Monthly journals
Chemistry journals
English-language journals
Publications established in 1990
Elsevier academic journals